In coding theory, the Lee distance is a distance between two strings  and  of equal length n over the q-ary alphabet } of size .  It is a metric defined as

If  or   the Lee distance coincides with the Hamming distance, because both distances are 0 for two single equal symbols and 1 for two single non-equal symbols. For  this is not the case anymore; the Lee distance between single letters can become bigger than 1.

This can also be thought of as the quotient metric resulting from reducing  with the Manhattan distance modulo the lattice .

The metric space induced by the Lee distance is a discrete analog of the elliptic space.

Example

History and application
The Lee distance is named after Dr. William C. Y. Lee. It is applied for phase modulation while the Hamming distance is used in case of orthogonal modulation.

The Berlekamp code is an example of code in the Lee metric. Other significant examples are the Preparata code and Kerdock code; these codes are non-linear when considered over a field, but are linear over a ring.

References

 
 
 

Coding theory
String metrics